The Museo Mitre (Spanish) (Mitre Museum) in Buenos Aires, Argentina, is a museum dedicated to Argentine history, as well as to the legacy of President Bartolomé Mitre.

Overview 
The museum building is a Spanish colonial house built in 1785.  It first appears in Argentine history as the refuge of the last Viceroy of Río de la Plata, Baltasar Hidalgo de Cisneros, following the May Revolution of 1810.  In 1860 the house was rented by General Bartolomé Mitre in 1860, and was his residence during his tenure as the 6th President of Argentina between 1862 and 1868. In 1868 the house was purchased and donated to Mitre by a group of local citizens in recognition of his term as President, as well as for his contributions to national unity; he lived there until his death in 1906. La Nación, one of the nation's oldest and most influential dailies, was published here from its establishment in 1870, until 1895.

The house was purchased by the National Government via Law 4.943, in June of that year, and on June 3, 1907, the Mitre Museum opened its doors to the public. The museum's first director, Alejandro Rosa, had founded the Western Hemisphere Historic and Numismatic Society with Mitre in 1893, and following the classification of Mitre's extensive ethnolinguistic library, numismatic and other collections, the society was located in the museum from 1918 until 1971 (it was rechartered as the National Academy of History of Argentina in 1938).

The museum was declared a National Historic Monument on May 21, 1942, and is maintained by the National Secretariat of Culture.  The museum can be seen on some Argentine two peso bills.

See also
List of museums in Argentina
List of National Historic Monuments of Argentina

References

External links

 Official website

National Historic Monuments of Argentina
Houses completed in 1785
Museums established in 1907
Museums in Buenos Aires
Biographical museums in Argentina
Historic house museums in Argentina